The 23rd TVyNovelas Awards is an Academy of special awards to the best soap operas and TV shows. The awards ceremony took place on April 23, 2005 in Mexico D.F. The ceremony was televised in Mexico by El canal de las estrellas.

René Strickler and Lucero hosted the show. Rubí won 5 awards including Best Telenovela, the most for the evening. Other winners Apuesta por un amor won 2 awards and Inocente de ti won one award.

Summary of awards and nominations

Winners and nominees

Telenovelas

Others

Special awards
Award for Best Excellence: Ernesto Alonso
Special Award for her 25-year Artistic Career: Lucero

References 

TVyNovelas Awards
TVyNovelas Awards
TVyNovelas Awards
TVyNovelas Awards ceremonies